Dragutin Horvat (born 8 January 1976) is a German professional darts player of Croatian origin. He currently plays in Professional Darts Corporation (PDC) events.

Career
Horvat reached the quarter-finals of the 2016 International Darts Open, defeating Ricky Evans, Gerwyn Price and Ian White before being eliminated by Kim Huybrechts.

Horvat qualified for the 2017 PDC World Darts Championship after defeating Stefan Stoyke 10–6 in the final of the Superleague Germany finals event. He beat Russia's Boris Koltsov in a sudden-death leg in the preliminary round, but was then beaten 3–0 by Simon Whitlock in the first round.

World Championship results

PDC
 2017: First round (lost to Simon Whitlock 0–3) (sets)

References

External links

German darts players
Croatian darts players
German people of Croatian descent
Sportspeople from Kassel
1976 births
Professional Darts Corporation associate players
Living people